Mediator of RNA polymerase II transcription subunit 25 is an enzyme that in humans is encoded by the MED25 gene.

Interactions 

MED25 has been shown to interact with MED4.

References

Further reading

External links 
  GeneReviews/NCBI/NIH/UW entry on Charcot-Marie-Tooth Neuropathy Type 2